Porto Walter ( or ) is a municipality located in the west of the Brazilian state of Acre. Its population is 12,241 and its area is 6,136 km².

The municipality contains 27% of the  Serra do Divisor National Park, created in 1989.

References

Municipalities in Acre (state)